Foochow College was a college in Fuzhou, China. It had a long history in the late nineteenth and early twentieth century with American Christian missionaries who taught there.

Charles Hartwell spent much time at the college and Willard Livingstone Beard led it from 1912 to 1927.

Having merged other smaller colleges in Fuzhou, it became the main forerunner of Fuzhou No.5 Middle School in 1952, which resumed the former Chinese name of Fuzhou Gezhi High School in 1992.

Universities and colleges in Fujian
Christian colleges in China
Education in Fuzhou